
This is a list of players who graduated from the Nike Tour in 1995. The top ten players on the Nike Tour's money list in 1995 earned their PGA Tour card for 1996.

*PGA Tour rookie for 1996.

T = Tied
Green background indicates the player retained his PGA Tour card for 1997 (finished inside the top 125).
Yellow background indicates player did not retain his PGA Tour card for 1997, but retained conditional status (finished between 126 and 150).
Red background indicates the player did not retain his PGA Tour card for 1997 (finished outside the top 150).

Runners-up on the PGA Tour in 1996

See also
1995 PGA Tour Qualifying School graduates

References
Money list

Korn Ferry Tour
PGA Tour
Nike Tour graduates
Nike Tour graduates